Telestream, Inc. is an American privately held computer software company.

History
The company, founded in 1998, is headquartered in Nevada City, California with personnel in France, Germany, Sweden, Poland, Canada and the UK.

Telestream provides live and on-demand digital video tools and workflow solutions.

As of Q1 2010, revenues for enterprise products were up 25% for the first quarter over the previous year, and desktop products grew by 45%. More than 80% of the top broadcast station groups, media companies and Fortune 100 companies, along with millions of consumers, currently use Telestream products.

In May 2022, it was announced Telestream had acquired the Aspen-based cloud media processing platform, Encoding.com.

Awards
 On September 11, 2015, Telestream has been honored with an Emmy Award for Technology and Engineering.

References

Companies based in Nevada County, California
Software companies established in 1998
Macintosh software companies